Nils Arvid Birger Holmberg (10 October 1886 – 11 September 1958) was a Swedish gymnast. He was part of the Swedish team that won the all-around title at the 1908 Summer Olympics. The team included his brothers Carl and Oswald.

References

1886 births
1958 deaths
Swedish male artistic gymnasts
Gymnasts at the 1908 Summer Olympics
Olympic gymnasts of Sweden
Olympic gold medalists for Sweden
Olympic medalists in gymnastics
Medalists at the 1908 Summer Olympics
Sportspeople from Malmö
20th-century Swedish people